Rhescuporis I (Tiberios Iulios Rheskouporis Philocaesar Philoromaios Eusebes, flourished 1st century, died 93), often alternatively enumerated as Rhescuporis II, was a Roman client king of the Bosporan Kingdom.

Life
Rhescuporis I was the son and heir of the Roman Client King Cotys I and Roman Client Queen Eunice. He was of Greek, Iranian and Roman ancestry. His paternal uncle Mithridates, was a previous Bosporan King.

His paternal grandmother was the late Bosporan Roman Client Queen Gepaepyris. Through her, Rhescuporis I was a descendant of the Roman Triumvir Mark Antony from his second marriage to his paternal cousin Antonia Hybrida Minor (second daughter of Roman Republican Politician Gaius Antonius Hybrida, Antony's paternal uncle), thus Rhescuporis I was related to various members of the Julio-Claudian dynasty. Through Gepaepyris, he was a descendant of Roman Client Rulers Polemon I of Pontus, Pythodorida of Pontus and Cotys VIII of Thrace. The name of Rhescuporis I is an ancestral monarch name of Thracian origin that derived from the family of his paternal grandmother.

His paternal grandfather was the late Bosporan Roman Client King Aspurgus. Through him, Rhescuporis I, was a descendant of the Greek Macedonian Kings: Antigonus I Monophthalmus, Seleucus I Nicator and the regent, Antipater. These three men served under King Alexander the Great. Through his grandfather, Rhescuporis I was a descendant of the monarchs Mithridates VI of Pontus and his first wife, his sister Laodice and the previous Bosporan King Asander.

Reign
Little is known of the life of Rhescuporis I. In 63 for unknown reasons, the Roman Emperor Nero disposed Cotys I, and his fate afterwards is unknown. The Bosporan Kingdom was incorporated as a part of the Roman Province of Moesia Inferior from 63 to 68. Perhaps Nero wanted to minimize the role, power and influence of local client rulers and desired the Bosporan to be completely governed by the Roman state.

In June 68, Nero had died and Galba succeeded Nero as Roman Emperor. With the help from his mother, Rhescuporis I successfully attempted to have the Bosporan Kingdom restored as a client kingdom to him from Galba. He was able to make the Bosporan Kingdom stable and semi-independent once more. At least in the first year of his reign, his mother co-ruled with him and acted as his regent. The Bosporan Kingdom was able to continue their trade with Anatolia. His royal title on coins is in Greek: ΒΑΣΙΛΕΩΣ ΡΗΣΚΟΥΠΟΡΙΔΟΣ or of King Rhescuporis. Rhescuporis I was a contemporary of the rule to the Year of the Four Emperors, the Flavian dynasty, in particular the reign of Roman Emperor Domitian.

Rhescuporis I reigned as king until AD 93. His wife is unknown, but from this marriage he had a son Sauromates I, who succeeded him. Through Sauromates I, Rhescuporis I had many descendants who ruled the Bosporan throne until the mid-4th century, four of whom bore his name.

See also
 Roman Crimea

Notes

References

 A dictionary of the Roman Empire, By Matthew Bunson, Edition: illustrated Published by Oxford University Press US, 1995, 

Monarchs of the Bosporan Kingdom
Roman client rulers
90 deaths
1st-century monarchs in Europe
Year of birth unknown
Rhesucuporis, Tiberius 1